This is a list of military accidents in Taiwan (Republic of China) involving the Republic of China Armed Forces.

2007
In April eight people aboard a Bell UH-1H military helicopter were killed in a crash. In May a F-5F fighter crashed into base housing occupied by Singaporean personal killing the pilots. Nine Singaporeans on the ground were injured and two were killed.

2008
An S-70C Seahawk crash killed one crew member, injured two and left two others missing, 

Two pilots were killed after crash landing their AH-1W Super Cobra attack helicopter in the island's north.

2011
3 pilots and one US-made RF-5 surveillance plane and a two-seater F-5F trainer.

2015
In 2015 two United States Marine Corps F/A-18C Hornets made an unscheduled landing at Tainan Airport after one of them developed an engine anomaly in-flight. The aircraft were accommodated in an air force hangar until a Lockheed C-130 Hercules full of American technicians could be flown in to repair the aircraft.

2019
In 2019 a Singaporean soldier was seriously injured during nighttime parachute training. He underwent intensive surgery in Taiwan. In 2020 he was flown back to Singapore aboard a Singapore Air Force A330 Multi-Role Tanker Transport.

2020

In January Taiwan's top military chief Shen Yi-Ming was killed along with eight other senior officers when their Black Hawk helicopter crashed in the mountains near Taipei.

In July Taiwan's Bell OH-58 Kiowa helicopter fleet was grounded after a crash at Hsinchu Air Force base, killing the two pilots.

In October a F-5 fighter jet crashed and its pilot was killed after it plunged into the sea several hundred meters (a half-mile) off the coast of Taitung County.

In November a F-16 fighter jet crashed minutes after takeoff from Hualien Air Base.

In December a hiker on a coastal trail on Shoushan in Kaohsiung was injured by a stray bullet believed to have originated from an offshore firing range.

2021 

Two F-5 fighter jets crashed into the sea near the southeastern coast in an apparent collision, resulting in two deaths. The air force later grounded all F-5s and suspended all training missions, after concerns were raised about both training and maintenance.

2022 

In January a F-16 fighter jet crashed into the sea while taking part in training exercises. Combat training for Taiwan's F-16 fleet was suspended in the aftermath of the crash. 

On 14 March a Dassault Mirage 2000 fighter jet crashed into the sea after a mechanical problem while on a training mission from Chihhang Air Base.

In May a AIDC AT-3 training aircraft crashed minutes after taking off from the southern port city of Kaohsiung during a training mission. The air force halted all academy training flights as President Tsai Ing-wen ordered an investigation into the cause of the incident.

References

Man-made disasters in Taiwan
Military history of Taiwan